There are two grammar schools in Grantham, Lincolnshire:
The King's School, Grantham
Kesteven and Grantham Girls' School